Andrea Stinson (born November 25, 1967) is a retired professional basketball player from the United States, playing from 1998 to 2005 for the Charlotte Sting and the Detroit Shock.

Early life 
Andrea went to North Mecklenburg High School in Huntersville, North Carolina. Andrea was selected as the female player of the year for the North Carolina High School Athletic Association in 1986–87. The Charlotte Observer named her North Carolina Miss Basketball in 1987. She played college basketball for North Carolina State University. She finished her NC State career third in scoring (2,136), third in field goals (917), third in steals (286), sixth in assists (402) and sixth in blocked shots (84).

NC State statistics
Source

USA Basketball
Stinson played with the USA team at the 1991 Pan American Games. The team finished with a record of 4–2, but managed to win the bronze medal. The USA team lost a three-point game to Brazil, then responded with wins over Argentina and Cuba, earning a spot in the medal round. The next game was a rematch against Cuba, and this time the team from Cuba won a five-point game. The USA beat Canada easily to win the bronze. Stinson averaged 3.0 points per game.

Stinson was named to the USA team competing in the 1992 William Jones Cup competition in Taipei, Taiwan. The team won all eight games and won the gold medal. Stinson averaged 11.1 points per game, second highest on the team.

Career highlight

 Three-time Italian League All-Star for Parma (1994–95), Cesena (1995–96) and Thiene (1996–97)
 Only player in the league with 400 points, 125 rebounds and 120 assists in 1997 and 1998
 Became the fourth player in league history to score 2,000 career points in 2001
 Named to the Eastern Conference All-Star Team in 2001

Overseas career

 1992–1994:  Tarbes GB
 1994–1995:  Lavezzini Parma
 1995–1996:  Ahena Cesena
 1996–1997:  Thiene
 1998–2001:  Galatasaray
 2001–2002:  Botassport Adana

Coaching career
 2019 Head Coach at Walter Williams High School

Sports Diplomacy 
Ms. Stinson has also been an active participant in the SportsUnited Sports Envoy program for the U.S. Department of State. In this function, she has traveled to Algeria, Bahrain, and Jordan where she worked with Shameka Christon, Martin Conlon, Sam Perkins, Sam Vincent, and Jerome Williams to conduct basketball clinics and events that reached more than 400 youth from underserved areas. In so doing, Stinson helped contribute to SportsUnited's mission to foster greater understanding between people and cultures.

WNBA career statistics

Regular season

|-
| style="text-align:left;"|1997
| style="text-align:left;"|Charlotte
| 28 || 28 || 36.1 || .447 || .325 || .674 || 5.5 || 4.4 || 1.5 || 0.8 || 3.5 || 15.7
|-
| style="text-align:left;"|1998
| style="text-align:left;"|Charlotte
| 30 || 30 || 34.9 || .418 || .282 || .750 || 4.6 || 4.5 || 1.8 || 0.5 || 2.6 || 15.0
|-
| style="text-align:left;"|1999
| style="text-align:left;"|Charlotte
| 32 || 32 || 32.5 || .460 || .309 || .739 || 3.5 || 2.9 || 1.0 || 0.6 || 2.1 || 13.6
|-
| style="text-align:left;"|2000
| style="text-align:left;"|Charlotte
| 32 || 32 || 35.1 || .462 || .358 || .739 || 4.3 || 3.8 || 1.7 || 0.7 || 2.7 || 17.7
|-
| style="text-align:left;"|2001
| style="text-align:left;"|Charlotte
| 32 || 32 || 31.4 || .484 || .446 || .797 || 4.3 || 2.8 || 1.3 || 0.6 || 2.2 || 14.1
|-
| style="text-align:left;"|2002
| style="text-align:left;"|Charlotte
| 32 || 32 || 29.7 || .456 || .414 || .688 || 5.5 || 2.8 || 1.2 || 0.3 || 1.6 || 12.8
|-
| style="text-align:left;"|2003
| style="text-align:left;"|Charlotte
| 34 || 34 || 29.4 || .458 || .307 || .759 || 4.1 || 2.9 || 1.4 || 0.2 || 2.2 || 11.1
|-
| style="text-align:left;"|2004
| style="text-align:left;"|Charlotte
| 34 || 34 || 22.9 || .414 || .297 || .773 || 3.5 || 1.4 || 0.8 || 0.2 || 1.2 || 6.0
|-
| style="text-align:left;"|2005
| style="text-align:left;"|Detroit
| 18 || 1 || 5.7 || .348 || .200 || .667 || 0.7 || 0.7 || 0.2 || 0.0 || 0.2 || 1.2
|-
| style="text-align:left;"|Career
| style="text-align:left;"|9 years, 2 teams
| 272 || 255 || 29.6 || .451 || .339 || .736 || 4.1 || 3.0 || 1.3 || 0.4 || 2.1 || 12.3

Playoffs

|-
| style="text-align:left;"|1997
| style="text-align:left;"|Charlotte
| 1 || 1 || 34.0 || .273 || .000 || 1.000 || 0.0 || 3.0 || 0.0 || 0.0 || 3.0 || 8.0
|-
| style="text-align:left;"|1998
| style="text-align:left;"|Charlotte
| 2 || 2 || 35.5 || .444 || .286 || .600 || 5.0 || 6.5 || 2.0 || 0.0 || 3.0 || 14.5
|-
| style="text-align:left;"|1999
| style="text-align:left;"|Charlotte
| 4 || 4 || 38.3 || .500 || .286 || .789 || 7.5 || 4.3 || 2.8 || 0.3 || 1.3 || 20.8
|-
| style="text-align:left;"|2001
| style="text-align:left;"|Charlotte
| 8 || 8 || 34.8 || .389 || .385 || .810 || 6.1 || 3.3 || 1.6 || 0.3 || 2.3 || 12.0
|-
| style="text-align:left;"|2002
| style="text-align:left;"|Charlotte
| 2 || 2 || 32.5 || .480 || .571 || 1.000 || 5.5 || 4.5 || 3.5 || 0.0 || 2.0 || 15.0
|-
| style="text-align:left;"|2003
| style="text-align:left;"|Charlotte
| 2 || 2 || 32.0 || .429 || .429 || 1.000 || 4.5 || 3.5 || 1.0 || 0.0 || 2.0 || 18.0
|-
| style="text-align:left;"|Career
| style="text-align:left;"|6 years, 1 team
| 19 || 19 || 35.0 || .432 || .360 || .828 || 4.1 || 3.0 || 1.3 || 0.4 || 2.1 || 12.3

References

External links 
Player Statistics - WNBA

1967 births
Living people
All-American college women's basketball players
American expatriate basketball people in France
American expatriate basketball people in Italy
American expatriate basketball people in Turkey
American women's basketball coaches
American women's basketball players
Basketball players at the 1991 Pan American Games
Basketball players from North Carolina
Beşiktaş women's basketball players
Charlotte Sting players
Detroit Shock players
Galatasaray S.K. (women's basketball) players
NC State Wolfpack women's basketball players
Pan American Games bronze medalists for the United States
Pan American Games medalists in basketball
Parade High School All-Americans (girls' basketball)
Shooting guards
Tarbes Gespe Bigorre players
Women's National Basketball Association All-Stars
Medalists at the 1991 Pan American Games
United States women's national basketball team players